The Cabin in the Clearing was a British television series which aired in 1954 on the BBC. All five episodes are believed to be lost. It was a half-hour children's western set in Ohio in the early nineteenth century, and based on the 1890 novel of the same name written by Edward S. Ellis. Episodes were transmitted live, as was usually the case with 1954 BBC series, and don't appear to have been telerecorded.  The serial ran from 16 February to 16 March 1954, but a remake - which included some members of the original cast, such as Ann Hanslip, Derek Aylward and Ewen Solon - was shown between 14 January to 1 February 1959.

Plot
The Sutherlands, a frontier family settling out in Ohio, USA, find themselves under siege in the wilderness when the Miami Indians and Shawnee Indians tribes decide to unite and set about attacking white settlers. With help far away, the Sutherlands have only their friend Bradley Ripley - hidden out in the woods - to help them to have any chance of escape. Ripley is accompanied by Mul-Keep Mo, a Native Indian whose life he once saved, and together they must plot how to rescue the Sutherland family from their perilous situation.

1954 Cast Members
 Shaun Sutton as Silas Sutherland 
 Peggy Mount as Polly Sutherland
 Ann Hanslip as Alice
 Charles Swain as Scipio
 Derek Aylward as Brayton Ripley
 Tony Van Bridge as Simon Kenton
 Ewen Solon as Mul-Keep-Mo
 Carl Overing as Haw-Hu-Da

1959 Cast Members
 Thomas Heathcote as Silas Sutherland
 Brenda Dunrich as Polly Sutherland
 Ann Hanslip as Alice
 Joseph Leyode as Scipio
 Derek Aylward as Brayton Ripley
 Patrick Troughton as Simon Kenton
 Ewen Solon as Mul-Keep-Mo
 John Woodnutt as Haw-Hu-Da

References

External links

1954 British television series debuts
1954 British television series endings
1950s British drama television series
English-language television shows
British live television series
Lost television shows
BBC television dramas
Television shows based on American novels
Period television series
Black-and-white British television shows
1950s British children's television series